Lars Kristopher Larson (born March 6, 1959) is an American conservative talk radio show host based in Portland, Oregon. Larson worked in television and radio news from the 1970s to 1990s and has hosted The Lars Larson Show from flagship station KXL in Portland since 1997. Two versions of the show exist: the Northwest show airs from 12 p.m. to 3 p.m. (Pacific) and discussing Pacific Northwest issues. The Northwest show is syndicated on the Radio Northwest Network which is owned and operated by Alpha Media. The nationally syndicated program airs from 3 p.m. to 6 p.m.  (Pacific) and discusses national issues. The national show is syndicated by  Compass Media Networks.

Career
Larson began his broadcasting career at age 16, at KTIL in his hometown of Tillamook, Oregon, learning his trade under Mildred Davy. He later became an announcer at Eugene-based KWAX. From 1977 to 1979, Larson attended the University of Oregon in Eugene, but quit "after just a year to work in radio and television". Larson served as news director for KATR in Eugene from 1977 to 1978 and KBDF from 1978 to 1979 with internships at KEZI television and KPNW radio. He was later news director at KZEL in Eugene before moving to KJRB in Spokane, Washington in 1979 to be a reporter. While in Spokane, Larson took classes at Gonzaga University.

In 1980, Larson moved to Portland, Oregon, and KXL for what would become the first of two positions. Larson did the afternoon news. In 1983, he moved back to Eugene and was a reporter and eventually anchor for KVAL-TV. In 1985, Larson moved back to Portland, when he was hired by KPTV as a reporter for The 10 O'Clock News.

In 1988, he hosted a weekend talk show on KEX and transferred to KGW, where he would stay from 1989 to 1991.

In 1992, he helped to create the KPTV news magazine program Northwest Reports, a weekly one-hour show which debuted in September of that year.  Previously, since at least 1990, KPTV had aired documentaries or investigative stories under the name "Northwest Reports with Lars Larson" as segments within regular newscasts or occasionally as one-time specials, but not as a regular program.  For the new weekly show, Larson was both executive producer and on-air anchor.  It was a "60 Minutes-style investigative show" but focused on the Portland area and the Northwest.  The program won a regional Emmy Award for a story that exposed careless handling of customers' private financial information by certain local banks.

The Oregonian reported that Northwest Reports had "decent ratings" against "strong network competition", but not enough to attract sufficient advertising revenue. The program lasted more than four years, but was canceled in fall 1996, after which Larson resumed anchor duties on KPTV's 10 O'Clock News. In his radio career, Larson moved back to KXL in 1997, this time hosting a talk show, The Lars Larson Show, which aired from noon to 4 p.m.

After continuing to anchor the news for KPTV until 1998, Larson left the station in November of that year, "after months of pressure from station management over his other role as an outspoken radio talk-show host" on KXL.  KPTV management viewed his radio talk-show role as a conflict of interest with his role as a news anchor. He later began working at KOIN TV, hosting a morning program The Buzz until 2000.

On January 31, 2000, The Lars Larson Show began airing on nine radio stations (currently 22) via "The Radio Northwest Network". In 2002, Larson was listed in Talkers Magazine'''s Heavy Hundred (the most important radio hosts of 4,000 nationwide) for the first time. In July 2003, Larson began filling in for Talk Radio Network talk host Michael Savage. On August 14, 2003, Larson was hired by Westwood One Radio Network to host his own show for national syndication. The Lars Larson Show officially debuted on Westwood One on September 1, 2003, with 105 affiliates and grew to 175 affiliates. On March 19, 2009, Westwood One canceled The Lars Larson Show. Larson's national network show re-launched on newly formed Compass Media Networks on March 30, 2009.

On October 15, 2007, Larson requested that the Oregon State Bar Association investigate whether then Governor of Oregon Ted Kulongoski lied about having knowledge about the sexual abuse of a 14-year-old girl by ex-Governor of Oregon Neil Goldschmidt in the 1970s. Kulongoski, a lawyer, has denied knowing anything about Goldschmidt having sex with an underage girl. In a story reported in The Oregonian in June 2004, however, former Goldschmidt speechwriter Fred Leonhardt said he told Kulongoski about the abuse as far back as 1994, 10 years before Goldschmidt publicly admitted to it. Larson wants the state bar to determine if Kulongoski lied about the matter and whether his bar license should be suspended or revoked.  After an investigation, the state bar determined that both Kulongowski and Leonhardt were "credible" in their accounts of the matter, and closed the investigation for want of sufficient evidence to continue. Larson appealed the decision, calling it contradictory; upon appeal, the decision was upheld. The general counsel to the bar wrote an email to Larson stating that "given the directly contradictory accounts of the parties and the total absence of any other evidence, I cannot conclude that there is sufficient evidence to form a reasonable belief that misconduct may have occurred", noting that the only evidence against Kulongoski was the testimony of Leonhardt. She added that "it is indisputable that memories fade with time and that two people can walk away from the same conversation with very different ideas of what was said." Larson has accused the state bar of having "swept this matter under the rug".

Personal life
Larson was born in Taipei, Taiwan. His father served in the United States Navy, and when he began a career in forestry, the Larson family lived in Montana, California (Happy Camp, Somes Bar, and Dorris), and Klamath Falls, Oregon, before settling in Tillamook, Oregon, when Lars was a teenager. Lars has one sister, Patty Schild, of Sisters, Oregon.  He graduated from Tillamook High School, where he had been on the speech and debate team. In the early 1990s, he was married to Debb Janes, a Portland radio personality.  In 1997, Larson married Tina Larson. They live in Vancouver, Washington. He has two step-children.

Controversial remarks
In December 2005, Larson declared on-air that he was protesting the renaming of the traditional Christmas tree placed in Portland's Pioneer Courthouse Square a "Holiday Tree" by placing his own Christmas Cross in the square. The idea was reversed because of legal concerns for his flagship station.

On March 18, 2008, in the context of a discussion about Jeremiah Wright, Barack Obama and U.S. policy toward Israel, Larson called former president Jimmy Carter an anti-Semite on CNN's Lou Dobbs Tonight.

Awards
 National Press Club award "Can't You Hear the Whistle Blow?" (KPTV News 1988) This was also a finalist for a national Emmy.
 Peabody Award 1990 (KPTV Northwest Reports: "Mount St. Helens: A Decade Later")
 Northwest Regional Emmy Award for best investigative reporting (1994 KPTV Northwest Reports: "The Round File", with Gordon Coffin)
 As of 2020, Talkers Magazine rates Larson as the 13th most important radio talk show host in America.

References

External links

 
 KXL-FM radio 101.1 website, Portland, Oregon
 The Lars Larson Show soundclips hosted by soundcloud.com''
 Compass Media Networks
 

Living people
1959 births
American broadcast news analysts
American conservative talk radio hosts
American political commentators
Gonzaga University alumni
People from Eugene, Oregon
People from Siskiyou County, California
People from Taipei
People from Tillamook, Oregon
People from Vancouver, Washington
Radio personalities from Portland, Oregon
Television anchors from Spokane, Washington
University of Oregon alumni